Győző is a masculine Hungarian given name. It is the Hungarian translation of Viktor: győző (“conqueror”), győz (“to conquer”) + -ő (“present participle suffix”). It was created during the Hungarian language reform that took place in the 18th–19th centuries. It may refer to:

Győző Burcsa (born 1954), Hungarian football player
Győző Czigler (1850–1905), Hungarian architect and academic
Győző Exner (1864–1945), Hungarian chess master
Győző Forintos (1935–2018), Hungarian chess master and by profession, an economist
Győző Haberfeld (1889–1945), Hungarian gymnast
Győző Kulcsár (1940–2018), Hungarian fencer and olympic champion in épée competition
Győző Martos (born 1949), Hungarian football player
Győző Vásárhelyi (1906–1997), Hungarian-French artist, widely accepted as a "grandfather" and leader the Op art movement

Hungarian masculine given names